DigiPivot is a skilling programme designed for women. It is launched by Google India.

References

External links
 DigiPivot 
 

2020 establishments in India
Skill Development Programme
Skill Development Programme for women
Google India